Harold Leslie Hartley (27 May 1875 – 23 August 1958) was an engineer-fitter and member of the Queensland Legislative Assembly.

Biography
Hartley was born in Brisbane, Queensland, to parents William James Hartley and his wife Maria Freeman (née Byram). He attended State Schools in Cooktown, Blackall, and Rockhampton before attending Rockhampton Grammar School. On leaving school he became an apprentice engineer at Burns & Twigg in Rockhampton before becoming an engineer-fitter with the Queensland Railways. He fought with the 3rd Bushmen's Contingent during the 2nd Boer War and upon his discharge resumed his machine-shop duties. He was a member of the Australian Workers' Union and the Amalgamated Miners' Association.

On 23 April 1907 he married Emily Jane Campbell (died 1957) in Rockhampton and together had two sons. He died in Brisbane in August 1958 and was buried in the Toowong Cemetery.

Political career
Hartley, for the Labor Party, represented the state seat of Rockhampton from 1915 until 1929.

References

Members of the Queensland Legislative Assembly
1875 births
1958 deaths
Burials at Toowong Cemetery